Old Tamil is the period of the Tamil language spanning from 300 BCE to 700 CE. Prior to Old Tamil, the period of Tamil linguistic development is termed as Pre Tamil. After the Old Tamil period, Tamil becomes Middle Tamil. The earliest records in Old Tamil are inscriptions from between the 3rd and 1st century BCE in caves and on pottery. These inscriptions are written in a variant of the Brahmi script called Tamil Brahmi. The earliest long text in Old Tamil is the Tolkāppiyam, an early work on Tamil grammar and poetics, whose oldest layers could be as old as the mid 2nd century BCE. Old Tamil preserved many features of Proto-Dravidian, the earliest reconstructed form of the Dravidian including inventory of consonants, the syllable structure, and various grammatical features.

History 
According to Bhadriraju Krishnamurti, Tamil, as a Dravidian language, descends from Proto-Dravidian, a proto-language. Linguistic reconstruction suggests that Proto-Dravidian was spoken around the third millennium BCE, possibly in the region around the lower Godavari river basin in peninsular India. The material evidence suggests that the speakers of Proto-Dravidian were of the culture associated with the Neolithic complexes of South India. The earliest epigraphic attestations of Tamil are generally taken to have been written from the 2nd century BCE.

Among Indian languages, Tamil has the most ancient non-Sanskritic Indian literature. Scholars categorise the attested history of the language into three periods: Old Tamil (300 BCE–700 CE), Middle Tamil (700–1600) and Modern Tamil (1600–present). In November 2007, an excavation at Quseir al Qadim revealed Ancient Egyptian pottery dating back to first century BCE with ancient Tamil Brahmi inscriptions. There are a number of apparent Tamil loanwords in Biblical Hebrew dating to before 500 BCE, the oldest attestation of the language. John Guy states that Tamil was the lingua franca for early maritime traders from India.

Literary work
Many literary works in Old Tamil have also survived. These include a corpus of 2,381 poems collectively known as Sangam literature. These poems are usually dated to between the 3rd century BCE and 5th century CE, which makes them the oldest extant body of secular literature in India. Other literary works in Old Tamil include Thirukural, Silappatikaram and Maṇimēkalai, and a number of ethical and didactic texts, written between the 5th and 8th centuries.

Features
Old Tamil preserved many features of Proto-Dravidian, including inventory of consonants, the syllable structure, and various grammatical features. Amongst these was the absence of a distinct present tense – like Proto-Dravidian, Old Tamil only had two tenses, the past and the "non-past".  Old Tamil verbs also had a distinct negative conjugation (e.g.  [kaːɳeːn]  (കാണേൻ)) "I do not see",  [kaːɳoːm] ( (കാണോം) "we do not see") Nouns could take pronominal suffixes like verbs to express ideas: e.g.  [peɳɖiɾeːm]  (പെണ്ടിരേം) "we are women" formed from  [peɳɖiɾ]  (പെണ്ടിർ) "women" and the first person plural marker - (എം). Despite the significant amount of grammatical and syntactical change between Old, Middle and Modern Tamil, Tamil demonstrates grammatical continuity across these stages: many characteristics of the later stages of the language have their roots in features of Old Tamil.

Regional varieties 
The Tolkappiyam mentions about 12 moḻipeyar lands apart from the region where Centamil was spoken. Tolkappiyam 881 also mentions about dialectical words called Ticaicol. However, being a language with an established literature, it served as the administrative language all across the Tamilakam. Ulloor S. Parameswara Iyer in his work, Kerala Sahithya Charithram names these regions. Senavaraiyar and Mayilainatar, both interpret almost similar names for these  twelve Tamil dialectical regions of Old Tamil.

See also
Old Tamil words attested in Biblical Hebrew
Old Tamil words attested in Ancient Greek

Notes

References

Sources

 

 
 

 

Tamil language
Languages attested from the 3rd century BC
Languages extinct in the 6th century
6th-century disestablishments in Asia